Mo Ke (born September 8, 1982 in Changchun, Jilin) is a basketball player who plays center for the Bayi Rockets of the Chinese Basketball Association (CBA).

He entered the 2004 NBA draft, but went undrafted. No NBA teams showed interest in him since then, and he continued to play for the Bayi Rockets until 2014.

Personal
On September 9, 2009, Mo married basketball player Wang Fan (王凡), who played for Bayi China Telecom in the WCBA.

On January 24, 2010, Mo's wife collapsed during her team's practice. She was sent to No. 309 Hospital of Beijing for treatment after diagnosis of her condition as a pulmonary embolism. After her collapse, Wang never regained consciousness and she died on February 15, 2010. She was only 24 years old; the couple were married only for five months.

Mo married swimmer Zhou Yafei in 2012.

References

External links
 profile

1982 births
Living people
Chinese men's basketball players
Asian Games medalists in basketball
Asian Games gold medalists for China
Basketball players at the 2004 Summer Olympics
Basketball players at the 2006 Asian Games
Basketball players from Changchun
Bayi Rockets players
Centers (basketball)
Medalists at the 2006 Asian Games
Olympic basketball players of China
Manchu sportspeople
2006 FIBA World Championship players